Kusadak railway station is the rail station in Kusadak, Smederevska Palanka, Serbia. Located in the settlement Kusadak in the municipality of Smederevska Palanka. Railroad continued to Glibovac in one, and Kovačevac in the another direction. Kusadak railway station consists of four railway tracks.

See also 
 Serbian Railways

References 

Railway stations in Southern and Eastern Serbia